Austin Hollins (born November 8, 1991) is an American professional basketball player for Maccabi Tel Aviv of the Israeli Basketball Premier League and the EuroLeague. He played college basketball for the University of Minnesota.

Early life and high school career
Hollins was born in Arizona on November 8, 1991, and moved to Memphis, Tennessee, in the sixth grade. As a child, Hollins would practice basketball for hours, until his father forced him to stop playing.

Hollins attended Germantown High School, where he lettered on the basketball team under head coach Newton Mealer. He averaged just under 16 points per game as a junior, playing alongside future Belmont signee Ian Clark, on a team that went 20–12. Hollins drew attention from college programs, including Arizona State, Arkansas, Baylor, Georgia, Minnesota, Oregon State and the University of Memphis. As a senior, he averaged 18.9 points per game, in leading Germantown to a 24–9 record. The team reached the Region 8-AAA quarterfinals, where they lost to the state champion Melrose High School. The Memphis Commercial Appeal named Hollins to the Best of the Preps Class AAA Team. Despite sharing a last name, growing up in the same part of Tennessee, and wearing the same No. 20 jerseys in high school, Austin and Minnesota teammate Andre Hollins, are not related.

College career
As a freshman at Minnesota, playing under head coach Tubby Smith, Hollins averaged 4.5 points and 1.5 rebounds per game. He started five games and posted a 13-point performance against Indiana. After the team failed to receive an invitation to the 2011 NIT, Hollins considered transferring to another school.

In his junior year, he became recognized for his stifling defense. "I take a lot of pride in that, and it's kind of fun, locking down another team's top guy ... you may not hold them to zero points, but just making it tough for them – it's fun," said Hollins. In the 2013 NCAA tournament, Hollins contributed 16 points, four steals and a career-high seven assists, against UCLA in the Round of 64. He tallied 10 points and three rebounds, in the season-ending loss to Florida in the Round of 32.

Hollins scored 20 points and grabbed a career-high 14 rebounds, in a win over South Dakota State, in addition to eclipsing the 1,000 point mark for his college career. As a result, he was named the Big Ten Conference Player of the Week, for the week of December 16, 2013. In his senior year, head coach Richard Pitino referred to Hollins as, "a coach's dream", for his strong work ethic and lead-by-example style. Hollins endured a cold spell in the middle of the season, but regained his form towards the end of the regular season, as he scored 27 points in a win over the Iowa Hawkeyes. In the quarterfinals of the 2014 National Invitation Tournament, Hollins went 6–11 from behind the 3-point arc, and scored a career-high 32 points to help defeat Southern Miss. He scored 12 straight points in the first half to help Minnesota retake the lead. Minnesota won the NIT by defeating SMU, by a score of 63–65, behind 19 points from Hollins. He made the go-ahead 3-pointer with 46.1 seconds remaining and he was named NIT Most Valuable Player. During his college career, Hollins played in a school-record 140 games, breaking the record that was previously held by former teammate Rodney Williams. He led the team in steals with 75 and finished second in scoring average, with an average of 12.4 points per game.

College statistics

Professional career
Hollins wasn't drafted in the 2014 NBA draft. On August 2, 2014, he signed a one-year deal with Denain, of the French 2nd Division LNB Pro B. In 35 games played with Denain in the 2014–15 season (regular season & playoffs), he averaged 8.5 points, 1.7 rebounds, and 0.7 assists per game, in France's 2nd Division. He also spent the 2015–16 season with Denain, in the French 2nd Division, in which he averaged 12.5 points, 2.0 rebounds, and 1.7 assists per game, in 34 games played.

On June 20, 2015, Hollins was locked in to play for the Brooklyn Nets' Summer League squad, in the 2015 NBA Summer League. On July 17, 2016, Hollins signed with the Finnish League team Kauhajoen Karhu. With Karhu, he averaged 17.2 points, 4.7 rebounds, and 2.6 assists per game, in 47 games played in the 2016–17 Finnish League season. 

In 2017, he moved to the German League club Gießen 46ers. With the Gießen 46ers, he averaged 12.0 points, 2.7 rebounds, and 2.0 assists per game, in 29 games played in the 2017–18 German League season. In 2018, he moved to the German club Rasta Vechta. With Rasta Vechta, he averaged 16.5 points, 2.7 rebounds, and 1.8 assists per game, in 40 games played in the 2018–19 German League season. 

On July 15, 2019, Hollins signed with the Russian club Zenit Saint Petersburg of the VTB United League and the EuroLeague.  On June 12, 2021, Hollins and Zenit parted ways after two seasons.

On August 16, 2021, Hollins signed with Crvena zvezda of the EuroLeague, ABA League and the Basketball League of Serbia. The club won ABA League, Serbian League, and Serbian Cup in the 2021–22 season.

On June 27, 2022, Hollins signed with Maccabi Tel Aviv of the Israeli Premier League and EuroLeague.

Personal life
Hollins is the son of Angela and Lionel Hollins. He has three siblings: Lamont, Jackie and Anthony. His father is a former NBA player and head coach, who won an NBA championship with the Portland Trail Blazers, in 1977. His father last coached the NBA's Brooklyn Nets.

References

External links
 euroleague.net profile
 eurobasket.com profile
 Minnesota Golden Gophers bio

1991 births
Living people
ABA League players
American expatriate basketball people in Finland
American expatriate basketball people in France
American expatriate basketball people in Germany
American expatriate basketball people in Russia
American expatriate basketball people in Serbia
American men's basketball players
Basketball League of Serbia players
Basketball players from Tennessee
BC Zenit Saint Petersburg players
Denain Voltaire Basket players
Giessen 46ers players
Kauhajoen Karhu players
KK Crvena zvezda players
Maccabi Tel Aviv B.C. players
Minnesota Golden Gophers men's basketball players
People from Germantown, Tennessee
SC Rasta Vechta players
Shooting guards
Small forwards